Disconnect is the debut album by electropop group Iris, released in 2000. This album helped Iris win "Best Band" and "Best Album" awards at the American Synthpop Awards in 2000. Its single, "Annie, Would I Lie to You?" was one of the best-selling records in label A Different Drum's history.

Track listing

Personnel
 Reagan Jones - vocals, songwriting, keyboards
 Matthew Morris - keyboards, programming, production

References

External links
 [ Allmusic review]

Iris (American band) albums
2000 debut albums